The 2017–18 Liberty Lady Flames basketball team represents Liberty University during the 2017–18 NCAA Division I women's basketball season. The Eagles, led by nineteenth-year head coach Carey Green, play their home games at the Vines Center and were members of the Big South Conference. They finished the season 24–10, 16–3 in Big South play win the Big South regular season title. They won the Big South women's basketball tournament and earn an received automatic bid of the NCAA women's tournament where lost to Tennessee in the first round.

This was Liberty's final season as members of the Big South Conference, as the school announced on May 17, 2018 that they will be moving to the Atlantic Sun Conference for the 2018–19 season.

Roster

Schedule

|-
!colspan=9 style=| Non-conference Regular season

|-
!colspan=9 style=| Big South Regular Season

|-
!colspan=9 style=| Big South tournament

|-
!colspan=9 style=| NCAA Women's Tournament

See also
2017–18 Liberty Flames basketball team

References

Liberty Lady Flames
Liberty Lady Flames basketball seasons
Liberty